Birendra Nath Mazumdar M.D, was an Indian medical officer in the Royal Army Medical Corps serving in France in 1940. At the time, he was the only Indian officer in the British Army, and the only Indian POW to be held in Oflag IV-C, Colditz. After forcing a transfer to an all Indian POW camp in France, he escaped to Switzerland in 1943.

Mazumdar was the son of wealthy Bengali family. He had come to Britain from Gaya in 1931, qualified as a doctor and joined the Royal Army Medical Corp in 1939 when war broke out. In February 1940, he was posted to 18th British General Hospital at Étaples. In May 1940, he attempted to evacuate casualties to Boulogne, but was captured by the Germans.
 
In 1942, several months after arriving at Colditz, he was summoned to Berlin to meet with Subhas Chandra Bose (on 23 June 1942). There he was invited to join  the Free India Legion. Although he was a supporter of India's independence, Mazumdar refused the offer because he had pledged an oath of allegiance to King George VI. Mazumdar was returned to Colditz. He realised that his best chance of escaping would be to get transferred to an all Indian camp in France where security would be more lax. To achieve this, he staged a hunger strike in February 1943. After two weeks, Mazumdar was too weak to leave his bed but remained resolute. After 16 days the Germans agreed to a transfer. This gesture won him the respect of his fellow British prisoners. Mazumdar left Colditz on 24th February 1943.

Mazumdar was eventually transferred to a camp in Chartres. On 3rd June 1943, he escaped along with his friend Dariao Singh. The two walked 900 kilometres in 6 weeks to Switzerland and freedom. Mazumdar returned to the United Kingdom in 1946. He resumed his medical career and worked as a GP firstly in Wales and then Essex before retiring to Galmpton in Devon. In 1996 an archivist from the Imperial War Museum made several oral recordings with Mazumdar on the basis that these would not be released until after his death. Following his death in December 1997 aged 82, his widow Joan agreed to allow public access to the tapes.

References

Indian prisoners of war
Royal Army Medical Corps officers
Prisoners of war held at Colditz Castle
1987 deaths